Luxardo may refer to:
 Girolamo Luxardo, Italian liqueur manufacturer
 Plaza Luxardo, village in Argentina